Paarvai Ondre Pothume is a 2001 Indian Tamil-language romance film written and directed by Murali Krishna.  The film stars Kunal, Monal and Karan. The film's soundtrack was composed by Bharani and was a success. The film released on 16 March 2001 and became a relative success and Karan performance was critically acclaimed.

Plot 
Vinodh and Manoj are best friends. Manoj gives Vinodh a manager job of his three-star hotel. They both are in love with Neetha, but Neetha is actually in love with Vinodh. This causes a strain in their friendship, and Manoj fires Vinodh from his manager job.

The film ends with a message to the audience that 'love is divine (pleasing) but friendship is pristine (unspoilt)'.

Cast 
 Kunal as Vinoth
 Monal as Neeta
 Karan as Manoj
 Ramji as Manoj's friend
 Fathima Babu as Visalakshi, Vinoth's mother
 Dhamu as Gopal, Manoj's coworker
 Vaiyapuri as Guru, Manoj's coworker
 Balu Anand as Murugan, Manoj's home servant
 Alphonsa (special appearance in "Nee Paarthuttu Ponaalum")

Soundtrack 
The soundtrack was composed by Bharani and lyrics were penned by Pa. Vijay and Bharani.

References 

2001 films
2000s Tamil-language films
2001 romantic drama films
Indian romantic drama films